Juhi (also Romanized as Jūḥī; also known as Jūkhī) is a village in Shavur Rural District, Shavur District, Shush County, Khuzestan Province, Iran. At the 2006 census, its population was 309, in 48 families.

References 

Populated places in Shush County